Riek Gai Kok is a South Sudanese politician. He is a Lou Nuer, hailing from Chieng Man-nyang/Diang-nyang Akoba. A veteran politician, he has been a member of parliament in both Sudan and South Sudan. As of 2013, he served as Minister of Health of South Sudan.

1990s
As of the early 1990s, Riek Gai Kok served as head of the Relief Association of Southern Sudan, the humanitarian aid wing of the SPLA-Nasir. As of 1997-1998 he served as spokesperson of the South Sudan Independence Movement/Army (SSIM/A). As the late 1990s he served as wali (governor) of Jonglei state.

2000s
In 2002 he was named as chairman of the Southern States Coordination Council by president Omar al-Bashir. As SSCC chairman, Riek Gai Kok was charged with administering the states of Southern Sudan. The appointment followed the defection of Riek Machar to the rebel side. As of 2002, Riek Gai Kok was also serving as Minister of Animal Resources in the Sudanese government. At the time Riek Gai Kok was a leader of the South Sudan Defence Forces. Towards the end of the Second Sudanese Civil War he and a group of his followers broke with the SSDF leader Gordon Kong.

Riek Gai Kok was also a high-ranking member of the National Congress Party. He was the chairman of the Southern Sector of the NCP. He also served as advisor to the Sudanese president. On July 7, 2011, two days before the independence of South Sudan, Riek Gai Kok and other Southern NCP leaders held a press conference and declared their entry into the Sudan People's Liberation Movement.

Post-Independence
In August 2013 Riek Gai Kok was named Minister of Health in the government of South Sudan.

References

National Congress Party (Sudan) politicians
Sudan People's Liberation Movement politicians
Government ministers of South Sudan
Members of the National Assembly (Sudan)
Members of the National Legislative Assembly (South Sudan)